The 1997 Motor City Bowl was the inaugural edition of the new college football bowl game, and was played at the Silverdome in Pontiac, Michigan on December 26, 1997. The game featured the Marshall Thundering Herd of the MAC and the Ole Miss Rebels of the Southeastern Conference.

Background
The Rebels finished third in the SEC Western Division in their first bowl game since 1992. Marshall was champions of the MAC after beating Toledo in the 1997 MAC Championship Game in their first ever season in Division I-A. This was their first bowl game since 1948.

Game summary
In a game with 1,018 yards of total offense, Stewart Patridge threw 29-of-47 passes for 332 yards and 3 touchdowns with 1 interception to lead Ole Miss to victory. Deuce McAllister at running back. Chad Pennington threw 23-of-45 for 337 yards and 3 touchdowns. Randy Moss caught 6 passes for 173 yards.

Aftermath
This was the only Motor City Bowl featuring a team from the SEC. Marshall went to the next three Motor City Bowls. Ole Miss went to two more bowl games in the decade.

References

External links
 https://web.archive.org/web/20110608133202/http://www.mmbolding.com/bowls/Motor_City_1997.htm

Motor City Bowl
Little Caesars Pizza Bowl
Ole Miss Rebels football bowl games
Marshall Thundering Herd football bowl games
Motor City Bowl
Motor City Bowl